Herschell C. Turner (born March 29, 1938) is an American former professional basketball player.

Turner played basketball at Shortridge High School in Indianapolis and college basketball for the Nebraska Cornhuskers. Turner was selected by the Syracuse Nationals as the 45th overall pick of the 1960 NBA draft.

Turner played for the Anaheim Amigos and Pittsburgh Pipers of the American Basketball Association (ABA) during the 1967–68 season. Turner also played for the Harlem Globetrotters.

Following his basketball career, Turner became an exhibited painter.

References

External links

1938 births
Living people
Amateur Athletic Union men's basketball players
American men's basketball players
Anaheim Amigos players
Basketball players from Indianapolis
Chicago Majors players
Harlem Globetrotters players
Nebraska Cornhuskers men's basketball players
Pittsburgh Pipers players
Syracuse Nationals draft picks
Point guards